The 2007 Short Track Speed Skating World Cup was a multi-race tournament over a season for short track speed skating. The season began on 20 October 2006 and ended on 11 February 2007. The World Cup was organised by the ISU who also ran world cups and championships in speed skating and figure skating.

Calendar

Men

Women

See also
 2007 World Short Track Speed Skating Championships
 2007 World Short Track Speed Skating Team Championships
 2007 European Short Track Speed Skating Championships

References

ISU Short Track Speed Skating World Cup
Short Track Speed Skating World Cup
World Cup